Salil Parekh is the current chief executive officer and managing director of Infosys. Parekh took over from interim CEO U B Pravin Rao on 2 January 2018.

Early life and education 
He is a graduate from the Indian Institute of Technology, Bombay (IIT Bombay) in Aeronautical Engineering. Master of Engineering degree in Computer Science and Mechanical Engineering from Cornell University.

Parekh was member of the group management board at Capgemini, where he had worked since 2000, after Ernst & Young's consultancy division, where he had been working before, was merged into the company.

Most recently, he was member of the group executive board, and was appointed deputy CEO in March 2015. He was responsible for overseeing a business cluster comprising Application Services and Cloud Infrastructure Services among others.

Whistleblower allegations
One Board member of Infosys received two anonymous whistleblower complaints of unethical practices at Infosys that also accused Salil Parekh. Audit Committee of the Board of Directors conducted independent investigation into the allegations contained in the anonymous whistleblower complaints and determined that the allegations are substantially without merit. The Audit Committee conducted a thorough investigation with the assistance of independent legal counsel Shardul Amarchand Mangaldas & Co. and PricewaterhouseCoopers Private Ltd.

References

Cornell University alumni
Living people
21st-century Indian businesspeople
20th-century Indian businesspeople
IIT Bombay alumni
1964 births
Infosys people